The Big Show Show is an American sitcom created by Josh Bycel and Jason Berger. Produced by WWE Studios, it premiered on Netflix with eight episodes on April 6, 2020. The series stars professional wrestling veteran and titular character, the Big Show, with Allison Munn, Reylynn Caster, Lily Brooks O'Briant, and Juliet Donenfeld playing a fictionalized version of his family. The series was canceled after one season, ending with a Christmas special released on December 9, 2020.

Premise 
The show features professional wrestler Big Show as a fictional version of himself. The premise features his teenage daughter from his first wife moving in with him, his second wife, and two younger daughters.

Cast and characters

Main
 Paul Wight / Big Show as himself, a professional wrestler who is adjusting to both retirement and his oldest daughter moving in with him and his family
 Allison Munn as Cassy Wight, Show's supportive wife and mother of Mandy and J.J. She works as a real estate agent.
 Reylynn Caster as Lola Wight, Show's oldest daughter from his first marriage. She moves from Minnesota to Florida after her mother gets transferred to Brussels. She loves her father even though they can be competitive with each other.
 Lily Brooks O'Briant as Mandy Wight, Show's middle daughter. She admires women leaders such as Ruth Bader Ginsburg, Alexandria Ocasio-Cortez, and Leslie Knope.  In the series, she is running for student body president.
 Juliet Donenfeld as Jennifer Jane "J.J." Wight, Show's youngest daughter. She is a precocious child that likes to hack into things.

Recurring
 Jaleel White as Terence "Terry" Malick III, Show's best friend. He runs a fitness center. He likes to invent things.
 Ben Giroux as Coach Leslie Fener, Lola's ice hockey coach
 Jaime Moyer as Miss Riggi, J.J.'s teacher
 Asif Ali, as Bennett Patel, Cassy's co-worker and apprentice at the real estate company. He is the son of the neglectful company head (who later fired him because he touched him)
 Dallas Dupree Young as Taylor Swift, an easy-going classmate of Mandy's who runs against her for class president. His real given name is Cliff. 
 Tessa Espinola as Monica B., Mandy's classmate who is a big influencer at school. She hosts livestreams on the latest gossip.
 Jolie Hoang-Rappaport as Kennedy, Mandy's airheaded friend
 Emma Loewen as Olivia, Mandy's friend

Guests for the sitcom included former WWE wrestlers Mick Foley, Mark Henry, and Rikishi, and Queer Eyes Tan France.

Episodes

Season 1 (2020)

Christmas Special (2020)

Production 
The show was produced by WWE Studios and was broadcast on Netflix. Josh Bycel and Jason Berger were executive producers and showrunners, with Susan Levison and Richard Lowell serving as executive producers for WWE Studios. In September 2019, Big Show announced on "Stone Cold" Steve Austin's podcast that the show had filmed three episodes and would premiere around the time of WrestleMania 36 in April 2020. Later, it was announced that all 8 episodes would premiere on April 6, 2020, on Netflix. On August 31, 2020, Netflix opted not to order a second season for the series, but would end the series with a Christmas special, which was released on December 9, 2020.

Reception 
Joel Keller of Decider wrote that the sitcom was "okay to stream", and that Berger and Bycel's "comedy pedigrees help make the show a tiny bit better than your average TGIF/Nick/Disney family sitcom. That doesn't mean that it's a good show, but at least it's not terrible". Keller added that Big Show can do physical comedy "very well", while praising Munn for "handl[ing] it like a pro" and describing the daughter characters as the "usual mix of overly-verbal and super-precocious kids". Matt Fowler of IGN described the show as having "the potential to be either wholly terrible or fully great. The truth, overall, lies somewhere in between as Big Show proves himself to be an amiable, glowing, towering 'family man' capable of carrying multi-cam sitcom shenanigans". Randall Colbum of The A.V. Club also likened the sitcom to the TGIF sitcoms of the 1990s, and wrote: "As tends to happen in these sorts of stories, the very act of a man so large demonstrating vulnerability is all the punchline an audience needs." Common Sense Media gave the show three out of five stars, describing it as "a little rough, but mostly sweet".

A comedic recap and review podcast about the show, The Big Show Show Show, was launched in May 2020.

References

External links

2020 American television series debuts
2020s American sitcoms
2020 American television series endings
Television series about families
English-language Netflix original programming
Television series by WWE
Television shows set in Tampa, Florida